Joseph (Standard: Yōsef, Tiberian: Yōsēp̄; alternatively: יְהוֹסֵף, lit. 'Yahweh shall add'; Standard: Yəhōsef, Tiberian: Yŏhōsēp̄;) is an important figure in the Bible's Book of Genesis. He was the first of the two sons of Jacob and Rachel (Jacob's twelfth child and eleventh son). He is the founder of the Israelite Tribe of Joseph. His story functions as an explanation for Israel's residence in Egypt. He is the favourite son of the patriarch Jacob, and his jealous brothers sell him into slavery in Egypt, where he eventually ends up incarcerated. After correctly interpreting the dreams of Pharaoh, however, he rises to second-in-command in Egypt and saves Egypt during a famine. Jacob's family travel to Egypt to escape the famine, and it is through him that they are given leave to settle in the Land of Goshen (the eastern part of the Nile Delta).

The composition of the story can be dated to the period between the 7th century BCE and the third quarter of the 5th century BCE, which is roughly the period to which scholars date the Book of Genesis.

In rabbinic tradition, he is considered the ancestor of a second Messiah called "Mashiach ben Yosef", who will wage war against the forces of evil alongside Mashiach ben David and die in combat with the enemies of God and Israel.

Etymology 
The Bible offers two explanations of the name Yōsēf: first it is compared to the Hebrew root אסף (ʾ-s-p), meaning "to gather, remove, take away": "And she conceived, and bore a son; and said, God hath taken away my reproach" (Genesis 30:23); Yōsēf is then identified with the similar root יסף (y-s-p), meaning "to add": "And she called his name Joseph; and said, The LORD shall add to me another son." (Genesis 30:24).

Biblical narrative

Birth and family
Joseph, son of Jacob and Rachel, lived in the land of Canaan with ten half-brothers, one full brother, and at least one half-sister. He was Rachel's firstborn and Jacob's eleventh son. Of all the sons, Joseph was preferred by his father, who gave him a "long coat of many colors". When Joseph was seventeen years old, he shared with his brothers two dreams he had had: in the first dream, Joseph and his brothers gathered bundles of grain, of which those his brothers gathered, bowed to his own. In the second dream, the sun (father), the moon (mother), and eleven stars (brothers) bowed to Joseph himself. These dreams, implying his supremacy, angered his brothers and made the brothers plot his demise.

Plot against Joseph

Joseph's half-brothers were jealous of him; wherefore, in Dothan, most of them plotted to kill him, with the exception of Reuben, who suggested to have Joseph thrown into an empty cistern, intending to rescue Joseph himself. Unaware of this secondary intention, the others obeyed him first. Upon imprisoning Joseph, the brothers saw a camel caravan carrying spices and perfumes to Egypt, and sold Joseph to these merchants. Thereafter the guilty brothers painted goat's blood on Joseph's coat and showed it to Jacob, who therefore believed Joseph had died.

Potiphar's house
Ultimately, Joseph was sold to Potiphar, the captain of Pharaoh's guard. Later, Joseph became Potiphar's personal servant, and subsequently his household's superintendent. Here, Potiphar's wife (called Zuleika in later tradition) tried to seduce Joseph, which he refused. Angered by his running away from her, she made a false accusation of rape, and thus assured his imprisonment.

Joseph in prison

The warden put Joseph in charge of the other prisoners, and soon afterward Pharaoh's chief cup-bearer and chief baker, who had offended the Pharaoh, were thrown into the prison. Both men had dreams, and Joseph, being able to interpret dreams, asked to hear them. The cup-bearer's dream was about a vine with three branches that was budding. And as it was budding, its blossoms came out and they produced grapes. The cup-bearer took those grapes and squeezed them into Pharaoh's cup, and placed the cup in Pharaoh's hand. Joseph interpreted this dream as the cup-bearer being restored as cup-bearer to the Pharaoh within three days. The baker's dream was about three baskets full of bread for the Pharaoh, and birds were eating the bread out of those baskets. Joseph interpreted this dream as the baker being hanged within three days and having his flesh eaten by birds. Joseph requested that the cup-bearer mention him to Pharaoh to secure his release from prison, but the cup-bearer, reinstalled in office, forgot Joseph. After two more years, the Pharaoh dreamt of seven lean cows which devoured seven fat cows; and of seven withered ears of grain which devoured seven fat ears. When the Pharaoh's advisers failed to interpret these dreams, the cup-bearer remembered Joseph. Joseph was then summoned. He interpreted the dream as seven years of abundance followed by seven years of famine, and advised the Pharaoh to store surplus grain.

Vizier of Egypt

Following the prediction, Joseph became Vizier, under the name of Zaphnath-Paaneah (Hebrew: צָפְנַת פַּעְנֵחַ Ṣāp̄naṯ Paʿnēaḥ), and was given Asenath, the daughter of Potipherah, priest of On, to be his wife. During the seven years of abundance, Joseph ensured that the storehouses were full and that all produce was weighed. In the sixth year, Asenath bore two children to Joseph: Manasseh and Ephraim. When the famine came, it was so severe that people from surrounding nations came to Egypt to buy bread. The narrative also indicates that they went straight to Joseph or were directed to him, even by the Pharaoh himself. As a last resort, all of the inhabitants of Egypt, less the Egyptian priestly class, sold their properties and later themselves (as slaves) to Joseph for seed; wherefore Joseph set a mandate that, because the people would be sowing and harvesting seed on government property, a fifth of the produce should go to the Pharaoh. This mandate lasted until the days of Moses.

Brothers sent to Egypt

In the second year of famine, Joseph's half brothers were sent to Egypt to buy goods. When they came to Egypt, they stood before the Vizier but did not recognize him as their brother Joseph, who was now in his late 30s; but Joseph did recognize them and did not speak at all to them in his native tongue of Hebrew. After questioning them, he accused them of being spies. After they mentioned a younger brother at home, the Vizier (Joseph) demanded that he be brought to Egypt as a demonstration of their veracity. This was Joseph's full brother, Benjamin. Joseph placed his brothers in prison for three days. On the third day, he brought them out of prison to reiterate that he wanted their youngest brother brought to Egypt to demonstrate their veracity. The brothers conferred amongst themselves speaking in Hebrew, reflecting on the wrong they had done to Joseph. Joseph understood what they were saying and removed himself from their presence because he was caught in emotion. When he returned, the Vizier took Simeon and bound him as a hostage. Then he had their donkeys prepared with grain and sent the other brothers back to Canaan. Unbeknownst to them, Joseph had also returned their money to their money sacks.

The silver cup
The remaining brothers returned to their father in Canaan, and told him all that had transpired in Egypt. They also discovered that all of their money sacks still had money in them, and they were dismayed. Then they informed their father that the Vizier demanded that Benjamin be brought before him to demonstrate that they were honest men. Jacob became greatly distressed, feeling deprived of successive sons: Joseph, Simeon, and (prospectively) Benjamin. After they had consumed all of the grain that they brought back from Egypt, Jacob told his sons to go back to Egypt for more grain. With Reuben and Judah's persistence, they persuaded their father to let Benjamin join them for fear of Egyptian retribution.

Upon their return to Egypt, the steward of Joseph's house received the brothers. When they were brought to Joseph's house, they were apprehensive about the returned money in their money sacks. They thought that the missed transaction would somehow be used against them as way to induct them as slaves and to confiscate their possessions. So they immediately informed the steward of what had transpired. The steward put them at ease, telling them not to worry about the money, and brought out their brother Simeon. Then he brought the brothers into the house of Joseph and received them hospitably. When the Vizier (Joseph) appeared, they gave him gifts from their father. Joseph saw and inquired of Benjamin, and was overcome by emotion but did not show it. He withdrew to his chambers and wept. When he regained control of himself, he returned and ordered a meal to be served. The Egyptians would not dine with Hebrews at the same table, as doing so was considered loathsome, thus the sons of Israel were served at a separate table.

That night, Joseph ordered his steward to load the brothers' donkeys with food and all their money. The money they had brought was double what they had offered on the first trip. Deceptively, Joseph also ordered the steward to put his silver cup in Benjamin's sack. The following morning the brothers began their journey back to Canaan. Joseph ordered the steward to go after the brothers and to question them about the "missing" silver cup. When the steward caught up with the brothers, he seized them and searched their sacks. The steward found the cup in Benjamin's sack - just as he had planted it the night before. This caused a stir amongst the brothers. However, they agreed to be escorted back to Egypt. When the Vizier (Joseph) confronted them about the silver cup, he demanded that the one who possessed the cup in his bag become his slave. In response, Judah pleaded with the Vizier that Benjamin be allowed to return to his father, and that he himself be kept in Benjamin's place as a slave.

Family reunited

Judah appealed to the Vizier begging that Benjamin be released and that he be enslaved in his stead, because of the silver cup found in Benjamin's sack. The Vizier broke down into tears. He could not control himself any longer and so he sent the Egyptian men out of the house. Then he revealed to the Hebrews that he was in fact their brother, Joseph. He wept so loudly that even the Egyptian household heard it outside. The brothers were frozen and could not utter a word. He brought them closer and relayed to them the events that had happened and told them  not to fear, that what they had meant for evil, God had meant for good. Then he commanded them to go and bring their father and his entire household into Egypt to live in the province of Goshen, because there were five more years of famine left. So Joseph supplied them Egyptian transport wagons, new garments, silver money, and twenty additional donkeys carrying provisions for the journey.

Thus, Jacob (also known as Israel) and his entire house of seventy gathered up with all their livestock and began their journey to Egypt. As they approached Egyptian territory, Judah went ahead to ask Joseph where the caravan should unload. They were directed into the province of Goshen and Joseph readied his chariot to meet his father there. It had been over twenty years since Joseph had last seen his father. When they met, they embraced each other and wept together for quite a while. His father then remarked, "Now let me die, since I have seen your face, because you are still alive."

Afterward, Joseph's family personally met the Pharaoh of Egypt. The Pharaoh honored their stay and even proposed that if there were any qualified men in their house, then they may elect a chief herdsman to oversee Egyptian livestock. Because the Pharaoh had such a high regard for Joseph, practically making him his equal, it had been an honor to meet his father. Thus, Israel was able to bless the Pharaoh. The family was then settled in Goshen.

Father's blessing and passing

The house of Israel acquired many possessions and multiplied exceedingly during the course of seventeen years, even through the worst of the seven-year famine. At this time, Joseph's father was 147 years old and bedridden. He had fallen ill and lost most of his vision. Joseph was called into his father's house and Israel pleaded with his son that he not be buried in Egypt. Rather, he requested to be carried to the land of Canaan to be buried with his forefathers. Joseph was sworn to do as his father asked of him.

Later, Joseph came to visit his father having with him his two sons, Ephraim and Manasseh. Israel declared that they would be heirs to the inheritance of the house of Israel, as if they were his own children, just as Reuben and Simeon were. Then Israel laid his left hand on the eldest Mannasseh's head and his right hand on the youngest Ephraim's head and blessed Joseph. However, Joseph was displeased that his father's right hand was not on the head of his firstborn, so he switched his father's hands. But Israel refused saying, "but truly his younger brother shall be greater than he," a declaration he made just as Israel himself was to his firstborn brother Esau. To Joseph, he gave a portion more of Canaanite property than he had to his other sons; land that he fought for against the Amorites.

Then Israel called all of his sons in and prophesied their blessings or curses to all twelve of them in order of their ages. To Joseph he declared:

After relaying his prophecies, Israel died. The family, including the Egyptians, mourned him seventy days. Joseph had his father embalmed, a process that took forty days. Then he prepared a great ceremonial journey to Canaan leading the servants of the Pharaoh, and the elders of the houses Israel and Egypt beyond the Jordan River. They stopped at Atad where they observed seven days of mourning. Here, their lamentation was so great that it caught the attention of surrounding Canaanites who remarked "This is a deep mourning of the Egyptians." So they named this spot Abel Mizraim. Then Joseph buried Israel in the cave of Machpelah, the property of Abraham when he bought it from the Hittites.

After their father died, the brothers of Joseph feared retribution for being responsible for Joseph's deliverance into Egypt as a slave. Joseph wept as they spoke and told them that what had happened was God's purpose to save lives and the lives of his family. He comforted them and their ties were reconciled.

Joseph's burial

Joseph lived to the age of 110, living to see his great-grandchildren. Before he died, he made the children of Israel swear that when they left the land of Egypt they would take his bones with them, and on his death his body was embalmed and placed in a coffin in Egypt.

The children of Israel remembered their oath, and when they left Egypt during the Exodus, Moses took Joseph's bones with him. The bones were buried at Shechem, in the parcel of ground which Jacob bought from the sons of Hamor, which has traditionally been identified with site of Joseph's Tomb, before Jacob and all his family moved to Egypt. Shechem was in the land which was allocated by Joshua to the Tribe of Ephraim, one of the tribes of the House of Joseph, after the conquest of Canaan.

Composition and literary motifs

The majority of modern scholars agree that the Joseph story is a Wisdom novella constructed by a single author  and that it reached its current form in the 5th century BCE at the earliest. Its redaction history may have included a first "Reuben version" originating in the northern kingdom of Israel and intended to justify the domination by the "house of Joseph" over the other tribes, this was followed by a later "Judah-expansion" (chapters 38 and 49) elevating Judah as the rightful successor to Jacob, and finally various embellishments so that the novella would function as the bridge between the Genesis and the story of Moses and the Exodus.

The motif of dreams/dream interpretation contributes to a strong story-like narrative. The plot begins by showing Joseph as a dreamer; this leads him into trouble as, out of jealousy, his brothers sell him into slavery. The next two instances of dream interpretation establish his reputation as a great interpreter of dreams; first, he begins in a low place, interpreting the dreams of prisoners. Then Joseph is summoned to interpret the dreams of Pharaoh himself. Impressed with Joseph's interpretations, Pharaoh appoints him as second-in-command (Gen 41:41). This sets up the climax of the story, which many regard to be the moment Joseph reveals his identity to his brothers (Gen 45:3).

Jewish tradition

Selling Joseph

In the midrash, the selling of Joseph was part of God's divine plan for him to save his tribes. The favoritism Israel showed Joseph and the plot against him by his brothers were divine means of getting him into Egypt. Maimonides comments that even the villager in Shechem, about whom Joseph inquired his brother's whereabouts, was a "divine messenger" working behind the scene.

A midrash asked, How many times was Joseph sold? In analyzing , there are five different Hebrew names used to describe five different groups of people involved in the transaction of selling Joseph, according to Rabbi Judah and Rav Huna. The first group identified, are Joseph's brothers when Judah brings up the idea of selling Joseph in verses 26 and 27. The first mention of Ishmaelites (Yishma'elîm) is in verse 25. Then the Hebrew phrase ŉāshîm midyanîm sōĥrîm in verse 28 describes Midianite traders. A fourth group in verse 36 is named in Hebrew as m‘danîm that is properly identified as Medanites. The final group, where a transaction is made, is among the Egyptians in the same verse.

After identifying the Hebrew names, Rabbi Judah claims that Joseph was sold four times: First his brothers sold Joseph to the Ishmaelites (Yishma'elîm), then the Ishmaelites sold him to the Midianite traders (ŉāshîm midyanîm sōĥrîm), the Midianite traders to the Medanites (m‘danîm), and the Medanites into Egypt. Rav Huna adds one more sale by concluding that after the Medanites sold him to the Egyptians, a fifth sale occurred when the Egyptians sold him to Potiphar. (Genesis Rabbah 84:22)

Potiphar's wife
Joseph had good reasons not to have an affair with Potiphar's wife: he did not want to abuse his master's trust; he believed in the sanctity of marriage; and it went against his ethical, moral and religious principles taught to him by his father Jacob.  According to the Midrash, Joseph would have been immediately executed by the sexual assault charge against him by Potiphar's wife. Abravanel explains that she had accused other servants of the same crime in the past.  Potiphar believed that Joseph was incapable of such an act and petitioned Pharaoh to spare his life. However, punishment could not have been avoided because of her class status and limited public knowledge of her scheme.

According to Legend of the Jews, the name of Potiphar's wife is Zuleikha and when she was enticing Joseph to give up to her sinful passion, God appeared unto him, holding the foundation of earth (Eben Shetiyah), that He would destroy the world if Joseph touched her.

Silver cup for divination

Jewish tradition holds that Joseph had his steward plant his personal silver cup in Benjamin's sack to test his brothers. He wanted to know if they would be willing to risk danger in order to save their half brother Benjamin. Since Joseph and Benjamin were born from Rachel, this test was necessary to reveal if they would betray Benjamin as they did with Joseph when he was seventeen.

Raising Joseph
In one Talmudic story, Joseph was buried in the Nile river, as there was some dispute as to which province should be honored by having his tomb within its boundaries. Moses, led there by an ancient holy woman named Serach, was able by a miracle to raise the sarcophagus and to take it with him at the time of the Exodus.

Christian tradition 
Joseph is mentioned in the New Testament as an example of faith. Joseph is commemorated as one of the Holy Forefathers in the Calendar of Saints of the Armenian Apostolic Church on 26 July. In the Eastern Orthodox Church and those Eastern Catholic Churches which follow the Byzantine Rite, he is known as "Joseph the all-comely", a reference not only to his physical appearance, but more importantly to the beauty of his spiritual life. They commemorate him on the Sunday of the Holy Forefathers (two Sundays before Christmas) and on Holy and Great Monday (Monday of Holy Week). In icons, he is sometimes depicted wearing the nemes headdress of an Egyptian vizier. The Lutheran Church–Missouri Synod commemorates him as a patriarch on 31 March.

In addition to honoring him, there was a strong tendency in the patristic period to view his life as a typological precursor to Christ. This tendency is represented in John Chrysostom who said that Joseph's suffering was "a type of things to come", Caesarius of Arles who interpreted Joseph's famous coat as representative of the diverse nations who would follow Christ, Ambrose of Milan who interpreted the standing sheaf as prefiguring the resurrection of Christ, and others.

This tendency, although greatly diminished, was followed throughout late antiquity, the Medieval Era, and into the Reformation. Even John Calvin, sometimes hailed as the father of modern grammatico-historical exegesis, writes "in the person of Joseph, a lively image of Christ is presented."

In addition, some Christian authors have argued that this typological interpretation finds its origin in the speech of Stephen in Acts , as well as the Gospel of Luke and the parables of Jesus, noting strong verbal and conceptual collocation between the Greek translation of the portion of Genesis concerning Joseph and the Parable of the Wicked Tenants and the Parable of the Prodigal Son.

Islamic tradition

Joseph is regarded by Muslims as a prophet (Quran, suras vi. 84, xl. 34), and a whole chapter Yusuf (sura xii.) is devoted to him, the only instance in the Quran in which an entire chapter is devoted to a complete story of a prophet. It is described in the Quran as the 'best of stories'. Joseph is said to have been extremely handsome, which attracted his Egyptian master's wife to attempt to seduce him. Muhammad is believed to have once said, "One half of all the beauty God apportioned for mankind went to Joseph and his mother; the other one half went to the rest of mankind." The story has a lot in common with the biblical narrative, but with certain differences. In the Quran the brothers ask Jacob ("Yaqub") to let Joseph go with them. Joseph is thrown into a well, and was taken as a slave by a passing caravan. When the brothers claimed to the father that a wolf had eaten Joseph, he observed patience.

In the Bible, Joseph discloses himself to his brethren before they return to their father the second time after buying grain.  But in Islam they returned leaving behind Benjamin because the mizzen bowl of the king was found in his bag. Similarly, the eldest son of Jacob  had decided not to leave the land because of the oath taken to protect Benjamin beforehand. When Jacob learned their story after their return, he wept in grief till he lost his eyesight because of sorrow. He thus charged his sons to go and inquire about Joseph and his brother and despair not of God's mercy. It was during this return to Egypt that Joseph disclosed his real identity to his brothers. He admonished and forgave them, he sent also his garment which healed the patriarch's eyes as soon as it was cast unto his face. The remaining verses describe the migration of Jacob's family to Egypt and the emotional meeting of Jacob and his long lost son, Joseph. The family prostrated before him hence the fulfilment of his dream aforetime.

The story concludes by Joseph praying, "My lord you have indeed bestowed upon me of the sovereignty and taught me something of the interpretation of dreams- the (only) creator of heavens and the earth! You are my Guardian in this world and in the Hereafter. Cause me to die as a Muslim and join me with the righteous" (Qur'an 12:101).

Baha'i tradition
There are numerous mentions of Joseph in Bahá'í writings. These come in the forms of allusions written by the Báb and Bahá'u'lláh. In the Kitáb-i-Aqdas, Bahá'u'lláh states that "from my laws, the sweet-smelling savour of my garment can be smelled" and, in the Four Valleys, states that "the fragrance of his garment blowing from the Egypt of Baha," referring to Joseph.

Bahá'í commentaries have described these as metaphors with the garment implying the recognition of a manifestation of God. In the Qayyumu'l-Asma', the Báb refers to Bahá'u'lláh as the true Joseph and makes an analogous prophecy regarding Bahá'u'lláh suffering at the hands of his brother, Mírzá Yahyá.

Literature and culture 
 Somnium morale Pharaonis (13th century), by Cistercian monk Jean de Limoges, is a collection of fictional letters exchanged between Pharaoh, Joseph, and other characters of the narrative regarding the interpretation of Pharaoh's dream.
 Joseph and his Brethren, 1743, an oratorio by George Frideric Handel.
 Josephslegende (The Legend of Joseph) is a 1914 work by Richard Strauss for the Ballets Russes.
Joseph and His Brothers (1933–1943), a four-novel omnibus by Thomas Mann, retells the Genesis stories surrounding Joseph, identifying Joseph with the figure of Osarseph known from Josephus, and the pharaoh with Akhenaten.
1961 film, The Story of Joseph and His Brethren (Giuseppe venduto dai fratelli) 
1974 film, The Story of Jacob and Joseph
1979, New Media Bible Genesis Project (TV)-cap. Joseph And His Brothers 
 The long-running musical Joseph and the Amazing Technicolor Dreamcoat by Andrew Lloyd Webber and Tim Rice is based on the biblical story of Joseph, up through Genesis chapter 46. It was adapted into the 1999 film of the same name.
 In 1995, Turner Network Television released the made-for-television movie Joseph starring Ben Kingsley as Potiphar, Lesley Ann Warren as Potiphar's wife, Paul Mercurio as Joseph and Martin Landau as Jacob.
 In 2000, DreamWorks Animation released a direct-to-video animated musical film based on the life of Joseph, titled Joseph: King of Dreams. American Actor Ben Affleck provided the speaking voice of Joseph, with Australian Theater Singer David Campbell providing the singing voice
 Yousuf e Payambar or Joseph, the Prophet is an Iranian television series from 2008, directed by Farajullah Salahshur, which tells the story of Prophet Joseph from the Quran and Islamic traditions.
 The cultural impact of the Joseph story in early-modern times is discussed in 
 Rappresentatione di Giuseppe e i suoi Fratelli / Joseph and his Brethren - a musical drama in three acts composed by Elam Rotem for ensemble Profeti della Quinta (2013, Pan Classics).
 José do Egito (English: Joseph from Egypt) is a Brazilian miniseries produced and broadcast by RecordTV. It premiered on January 30, 2013, and ended on October 9, 2013. It is based on the biblical account of the book of Genesis that deals with the patriarch Joseph, son of Jacob.
 The 2003 VeggieTales children's video The Ballad of Little Joe retells Joseph's Genesis stories in the style and setting of an American Western film.
 The 2019 novel Joseph and the Way of Forgiveness by Stephen Mitchell retells the story of Joseph in the form of a midrash with emphasis on the thoughts and beliefs of a flawed Joseph.

See also
 Book of Joseph (Latter Day Saints)
 Joseph's tomb
 List of slaves
 Yousuf-e Payambar

References

Notes

Citations

Sources

Further reading

 
 
 Genung, Matthew C. (2017). The Composition of Genesis 37: Incoherence and Meaning in the Exposition of the Joseph Story . Forschungen zum Alten Testament 2. Reihe. 95. Tübingen: Mohr Siebeck. .

External links

BBC - Joseph

 
Biblical figures in rabbinic literature
Book of Genesis people
Burials in Israel
Children of Jacob
Christian saints from the Old Testament
Divination
Founders of biblical tribes
People whose existence is disputed